Tuchlovice is a municipality and village in Kladno District in the Central Bohemian Region of the Czech Republic. It has about 2,700 inhabitants.

Administrative parts
The village of Srby is an administrative part of Tuchlovice.

Geography
The municipal territory lies mostly in the Křivoklát Highlands, but it also extends into the geomorphological mesoregion of Džbán in the west, and to the Prague Plateau in the east.

History
The first written mention of Tuchlovice is from 1283. From 1613 until the establishment of a sovereign municipality in 1850, the village was owned by the Martinic family.

Transport
The D6 motorway runs through the municipality.

Sights
The landmark of Tuchlovice is the Church of Saint Gall. The originally Gothic church was first documented in 1330. After a fire, the church was rebuilt in 1844 and the tower was added.

References

External links

Villages in Kladno District